The Coppet group (Groupe de Coppet), also known as the Coppet circle, was an informal intellectual and literary gathering centred on Germaine de Staël during the time period between the establishment of the Napoleonic First Empire (1804) and the Bourbon Restoration of 1814–1815. The name comes from Coppet Castle in Switzerland.

The group, which broadly continued the activities of Madame de Staël's previous salons, had a considerable influence on the development of nineteenth century liberalism and romanticism. Stendhal referred to the Coppet guests as "the Estates General of European opinion."

Participants

Around the core group which consisted of the hosts at Coppet Castle, the Necker family, that is Jacques Necker and his daughter, Germaine de Staël and her long time lover, Benjamin Constant, with her cousin by marriage, Albertine Necker de Saussure, Wilhelm von Humboldt, Jean de Sismondi, Charles Victor de Bonstetten, Prosper de Barante, Mathieu de Montmorency and August Wilhelm Schlegel, there was a stream of international men and women visitors of influence. These included:

Ernestine von Arco, madame Maximilian von Montgelas
Odilon Barrot 
Louis de Beaupoil de Saint-Aulaire 
Andrew Bell
Wilhelmine von Biron von Kurland, Herzogin von Sagan
Claude Ignace de Barante 
Joseph Bonaparte
Ludovico di Breme
Victor de Broglie
Sir Henry Brougham, 1st Baron Brougham and Vaux
Friederike Brun
Lord Byron.
John Campbell, 1st Marquess of Breadalbane
Adelbert von Chamisso
François-René de Chateaubriand
Carl von Clausewitz
Jean-Barthélémy Le Couteulx de Canteleu (1749-1818)
Humphry Davy
Jane Davy, born Kerr 
Etienne Dumont
Mary Elliot
Sarah Sophia Fane, Countess of Jersey
Marc Etienne Frossard (1757-1815)
David François Gaudot (1756-1836)
Jean-Antoine Gauvin, dit Gallois (1761- 1828)
Charles de Gentil de Langalerie (1751–1835)
Joseph Marie de Gérando 
François Guizot
Emma, Lady Hamilton
Frederic-Cesar de La Harpe
John Cam Hobhouse
Claude Hochet
Charles Huchet de La Bédoyère 
Carolina Friederica von Humboldt
Countess Dorota Barbara Jablonowska, Madame Józef Klemens Czartoryski
Camille Jordan
Arnail François, marquis de Jaucourt
Wiktor Pavlovich Kotschubei 
Juliane von Krüdener 
Alexandre de Laborde
Alphonse de Lamartine
Matthew Gregory Lewis
Aline Lugo
Jacob Frédéric Lullin de Châteauvieux
Sir James Mackintosh
Louis Manuel
Friedrich von Matthisson
Luise von Matthisson 
Jakob Heinrich Meister
Francesco Melzi d'Eril
Dorothea Mendelssohn
John Izard Middleton
Johannes von Müller
Alexis de Noville
Adam Gottlob Oehlenschläger
Henry Petty-Fitzmaurice, 3rd Marquess of Lansdowne
Charles Pictet de Rochemont
Alfonso Pignatelli de Aragon
Gennaro Pignatelli, principe di Belmonte
John William Polidori
Prince Augustus of Prussia
Charles-Victor Prévot, vicomte d'Arlincourt
Juliette Récamier
Guillaume Anne de Constant Rebecque, seigneur de Villars (1750-1832)
François Dominique de Reynaud, Comte de Montlosier
Adolph Ribbing  
Carl Ritter
Albert de Rocca
Samuel Rogers
Sarah Rogers, sister of Samuel Rogers
Sir Samuel Romilly
Elzéar de Sabran (1774-1846)
Aleksander Antoni Sapieha
Pedro de Sousa Holstein, 1st Duke of Palmela
Spalding sisters
Jean-Baptiste-Antoine Suard
Christian Friedrich Tieck
Prince Peter Iwanowitsch Tufiakin
Henry Vassall-Fox, 3rd Baron Holland
Zacharias Werner
Charles de Villers
George Child Villiers, 5th Earl of Jersey
Élisabeth Vigée Le Brun
Caspar Voght

See also

 Club de l'Entresol

References

Further reading
 
 

 
19th-century literature
Literary movements
Political movements
History of liberalism
Romanticism